John W. Ratcliff (born 1961) is a video game programmer and designer best known for creating 688 Attack Sub and SSN-21 Seawolf.

Biography

John Ratcliff began his career as a software developer writing educational software as well as computer programs supporting cardiovascular research at the St. Louis University Hospital. Together with John A. Obershelp in 1988 he developed the Ratcliff/Obershelp pattern-matching algorithm also known as Gestalt Pattern Matching to improve educational software.

In conjunction with game publisher Electronic Arts in 1987, he helped create one of the first 256 color MCGA games, 688 Attack Sub. Several years later, he followed up with a sequel entitled SSN-21 Seawolf, and in 1997 released the game Scarab.

His most recent released title was as lead engine programmer for PlanetSide, published by Sony Online Entertainment. Ratcliff is also credited in Car & Driver (1992) and MechWarrior 2: 31st Century Combat (1995).

Ratcliff continues to be an active member of the game development community and has been a contributing author to such magazines as Dr. Dobb's Journal.  In 2006, he worked for AGEIA, where his role was to provide open source tools and technology to facilitate the integration of physics into games. Ratcliff is also a frequent speaker at industry conferences, with a focus on computer technology and algorithms.

Ratcliff also founded the discussion forums, which he called Atheist Apologetics Research Ministry in parody of Christian Apologetics and Research Ministry (CARM) and which, despite its name, did not promote atheism or any particular philosophy, but rather sought to allow greater latitude in discussions than did CARM's forums. He turned the forum over to another user in December 2006.

Games
 688 Attack Sub, 1989
 Car & Driver, 1992
 SSN-21 Seawolf, 1994
 Mechwarrior 2: 31st Century Combat, 1995
 Scarab, 1997
 PlanetSide 2003

References

External links
 Ratcliff's blog
 Stratics developer Profile with picture
 Autogenerated developer credits at Mobygames
CARM Evangelicals responses to AARM
CARM discussion forums

Ratcliff, John W.
Ratcliff, John W.
People from St. Louis
1961 births